Ara Damansara is an residential township in Petaling Jaya, Petaling District, Selangor, Malaysia. It is located along Jalan Lapangan Terbang Sultan Abdul Aziz.

History 

Ara Damansara was first developed in 1999 by Sime Pilmoor Development Sdn Bhd, a wholly owned subsidiary of Sime Darby Berhad, and managed by Sime UEP Development Sdn Bhd, Ara Damansara will encompass approximately 4,000 units of various property types once completed.

Background, progress and accessibility
It is  township taking shape on the Subang Airport airport highway (Federal Route 15) in Petaling Jaya is strategically located at the north and west of New Klang Valley Expressway (NKVE), east of Subang Airport Highway, south of Puncak Alam Highway. It is embraced by Kota Damansara to the north, Taman Tun Dr Ismail to the east, Subang Jaya to the south, and Kayangan Height to the west. It also sits between the Saujana Golf and Country Club and the Tropicana Golf and Country Club. It is served by the Federal Highway, Malaysia (Federal Route 2), New Klang Valley Expressway AH2, and Subang Jaya-Kelana Jaya Interchange nearby will provide motorists to the various part of Klang Valley via Federal Highway, New Pantai Expressway (NPE) and KESAS Highway. With its strategic location, easy accessibility, and affluent customer base, Ara Damansara is poised to be developed into a prestige township offering a lifestyle that promotes close-knit community living.

Accessibility into the township is via the six-lane dual carriageway Subang Airport Highway and Subang Kelana-Link interchange. Second access is through New Klang Valley Expressway tunnel via Crimson Condominium to Damansara–Puchong Expressway (LDP). The eastern portion of Ara Damansara is linked to Persiaran Tropicana passes through Damansara Idaman and Damansara Lagenda. Through Persiaran Tropicana residents of Ara Damansara can easily access to various commercial areas such as One Utama, Kota Damansara and Mutiara Damansara.

Ara Damansara has two Light Railway Transit (LRT) stations, namely Lembah Subang LRT station and Ara Damansara LRT station arising from LRT Kelana Jaya line extension just completed in June 2016.

Latest and future development 
"Ara Hill" is a signature development by Sime Darby Property, consisting of gated and guarded high-rise condos and low-rise villas on a  land.
"Verde" is a hotel-inspired residential development and just completed. Consisting of four towers (13 floors on each tower) in a gated and guarded community.
"Ara Greens Residences" is a development next to Verde.
"H2O Residency",  of freehold land located at the center of Ara Damansara township.
"Oasis Corporate Park" spans  of freehold land in Ara Damansara. It contains corporate offices, serviced suites, retail outlets, a hotel and convention centre.

Public transport 

Ara Damansara is connected to the LRT Kelana Jaya Line with 3 stations in the vicinity; Ara Damansara LRT Station, Glenmarie LRT Station and Lembah Subang LRT Station. Feeder bus around these stations help to connect the township and the area around it; T773 connects Ara Damansara LRT station to Sultan Abdul Aziz Shah Airport, while buses from Lembah Subang LRT station has buses that connects to Surian MRT station (T807) and that goes around Ara Damansara (T782).

References

External links
 Sime UEP Properties
 Eyes on Malaysia
 Ara Damansara

Townships in Selangor